The Wierzchowiny massacre was a massacre in the town of Wierzchowiny perpetrated by the National Armed Forces on 6 July 1945 led by Mieczysław Pazderski, also called "Szary" (Grey).

Background 
The reasons for the massacre differ between authors. According to some authors, some villagers allegedly supporting the upcoming communist regime, which was an enemy of the NAF that it wanted to avoid and stop at all costs. Historian Grzegorz Motyka stated that before the II World War, the Communist Party of Poland had influence in the region. It was also said that the citizens have collaborated with Soviet and Nazi governments. According to G. Motyka, the main motive was to rid the lands of minorities.

Course of the massacre 
Pazderski, without permission, decided to kill the most "dangerous" people. He had a list of people he planned to kill, which according to historian T. Swat was 30, while according to Motyka it was 19. On the morning of 6 July 1945, Szary's units entered Wierzchowiny and were greeted with great confusion from the local Ukrainian population. They returned later and committed the atrocity, murdering 196 locals. Other authors say that there were 194 casualties. Some NAF reports state that there were 396 killed, while the Communists say that there were 400 casualties. Both of those sources have not been proved as reliable The majority of people killed were Orthodox, though there were also 16 to 30 Jehovah's Witnesses murdered. 

Tadeusz S. stated that members of the NAF that died were killed in the fighting which followed after the genocide when the armies tried to remove the bunkers hidden in the village. Based on the witnesses' testimonies, the casualties didn't exceed 50. After Szary's soldiers left the settlement at 6 PM, an unidentified unit performed another mass murder, which was probably an action to discredit him. Other authors say it was a possibility that the local Polish population did it. Historians Rafał Wnuk, Grzegorz Motyka and Mariusz Zajączkowski call the theories "hardly believable", as there is little to no proof for them. Wnuk and Motyka also said that Szary changed the original plan and instead of murdering only some people, he destroyed the entire village, as he hoped to gain additional support from the local Polish population that had a strongly anti-Ukrainian sentiment. After the village was burnt down, the armies headed towards Sielec.

Aftermath 
On 23 July 1945, the NAF's official newspaper, Szczerbiec, admitted to committing the massacre and stated that they will commit similar atrocities if needed. Many disputes over the number of casualties began as more documents started to be uncovered. In the 90s, the NAF tried to deny the massacre, which failed to find any relevance and did not change anything.

Court problems 
On 15 June 1953 the high court of the Polish People's Republic ruled that a unit of the NAF under the leadership of Mieczysław Pazderski committed crimes against humanity in Wierzchowiny. In 1998 and 1999, the judgment was approved by the court of the new Polish Republic without any criticism. Many historians tried to prove its inaccuracies with unofficial documents that were unreliable and mostly used as a form of disapproval of the Communist regime.

Use in propaganda 
The Communist regime in Poland used the Wierzchowiny massacre as propaganda, calling it an example of "the fascists' savagery" (referencing the fact that the National Armed Forces had fascist ideas) and was used as a motive for fighting with the anti-Communist rebels. The Communists greatly overexaggerated the number of people killed, starting at 396, later 280, and settling at 194.

References

1945 in Poland
Mass murder in 1945
Massacres in 1945
June 1945 events in Europe
Anti-Ukrainian sentiment
Massacres in Poland
Massacres of Ukrainians during World War II
War crimes in Poland
National Armed Forces
Massacres of Ukrainians by Poles